The 1975 Sugar Bowl, was the 42nd edition of the college football bowl game, played at night in the new Louisiana Superdome in New Orleans, Louisiana, on Wednesday, December 31. Part of the 1975–76 bowl game season, it matched the fourth-ranked Alabama Crimson Tide of the Southeastern Conference (SEC) and the independent #8 Penn State Nittany Lions. In the first Sugar Bowl played in the recently completed Superdome, favored Alabama 

This was the last of four consecutive editions played at night on New Year's Eve; it returned to January 1 in 1977 as a day game.

Teams

Alabama

Alabama completed the regular season as SEC champions with a 10–1 record. The only defeat was a 20–7 non-conference loss to Missouri in week one. On November 17, bowl officials announced that Alabama would face Penn State in the Sugar Bowl. It marked the seventh 
appearance for Alabama in the Sugar Bowl, and their 29th bowl game.

The Tide entered the Sugar Bowl as a thirteen-point favorite, but without a win in its last eight bowl games.

Penn State

Penn State completed the regular season with a record of 9–2. Their only defeats were a 17–9 loss to Ohio State in week three and a 15–14 loss to the North Carolina State in week ten. On November 17, bowl officials announced that Penn State would face Alabama in the Sugar Bowl. The invitation for Penn State was controversial as Alabama's Bryant personally selected Penn State as their opponent instead of the Big Eight runner-up (#6 Nebraska), ranked higher than the Nittany Lions. Bryant was miffed that the Orange Bowl, which was committed to the Big Eight champion (#3 Oklahoma), had snubbed the Crimson Tide in favor of the Big Ten runner-up, #5 Michigan (the Big Ten (and Pac-8) allowed multiple bowl teams for the first time this season). In Bryant's view, this effectively killed Alabama's chances for a national championship. It was the second appearance for Penn State in the Sugar Bowl, and their fourteenth bowl game.

Game summary
The game kicked off shortly after 6:30 p.m. CST on New Year's Eve, televised by ABC.

After Penn State's Chris Bahr missed a 62-yard field goal, Alabama scored on a 25-yard Danny Ridgeway field goal. The second quarter was scoreless, and the Crimson Tide led 3–0 at halftime.

Penn State tied the game at three on a 42-yard Bahr field goal in the third quarter. Alabama responded on the following drive with the lone touchdown of the game, a 14-yard Mike Stock run, to take a 

A 37-yard Bahr field goal reduced the lead to four points with under twelve minutes remaining. The Crimson Tide responded with an extended drive, resulting in a 28-yard Ridgeway field goal to push the lead back to seven at 13–6, the final score. For his 210 yards passing after completing ten of twelve pass attempts, Alabama quarterback Richard Todd was named the games outstanding player.

It was Alabama's first bowl win in nine years (since January 1967) and started a string of six straight bowl victories.

Statistics
{| class=wikitable style="text-align:center"
! Statistics !! Penn State !!  Alabama 
|-
|align=left|First downs || 12|| 14
|-
|align=left|Rushes–yards|| 41–157 || 49–106
|-
|align=left|Passing yards || 57 ||210
|-
|align=left|Passes ||8–14–1 || 10–12–0
|-
|align=left|Total offense || 55–214 || 61–316
|-
|align=left|Punts–average ||4–48.5 || 5–40.8
|-
|align=left|Fumbles–lost ||1–0|| 1–0
|-
|align=left|Turnovers|| 1|| 0
|-
|align=left|Penalties–yards ||0–0||  3–22
|}

See also
 Alabama–Penn State football rivalry

References

Sugar Bowl
Sugar Bowl
Alabama Crimson Tide football bowl games
Penn State Nittany Lions football bowl games
Sugar Bowl
Sugar Bowl